= 1948 British Honduras general election =

General elections were held in British Honduras in May and June 1948.

== Electoral system ==
The Legislative Council consisted of six elected members, four members appointed by the Governor, three officials (the Attorney General, the Colonial Secretary and the Financial Secretary) and the Governor, who served as president. The elected members were elected from five constituencies, one of which (Belize) had two seats.

Voting was limited to British subjects or people who had lived in the territory for at least three years and who were aged 21 or over and met one of the financial requirements, which included paying an annual property tax of at least $6, paying at least $96 in rent a year, or being in receipt of an annual salary of at least $300. Anyone who had received poor relief from public funds in the three months prior to voter registration was ineligible. As a result of the criteria, only 1,772 people from a population of 63,139 were registered to vote.

== Results ==
| Constituency | Date | Elected member |
|---|---|---|
| Belize | 11 June | Herbert Fuller |
| Belize | 11 June | J.A. Smith |
| Northern | 15 May | William George |
| Stann Creek | 11 June | Catarino Benguche |
| Toledo | 9 June | Charles Westby |
| Western | 5 June | Harrison Courtenay |
Source: Colonial Reports

The nominated members were appointed on 29 June, with B.S. Clark, Salvador Espat, Edgar Gegg and James Macmillan appointed.
